Denis Linsmayer (born 19 September 1991) is a German professional footballer who plays as a defensive midfielder for FC Ingolstadt.

Career
Linsmayer began his career with 1. FC Kaiserslautern made his debut for the club in August 2012, as a substitute for Albert Bunjaku in a 2. Bundesliga match against Dynamo Dresden.

References

External links

1991 births
Living people
Association football midfielders
German footballers
1. FC Kaiserslautern II players
1. FC Kaiserslautern players
SV Sandhausen players
FC Ingolstadt 04 players
2. Bundesliga players
Regionalliga players
People from Pirmasens
Footballers from Rhineland-Palatinate